Lianmeng Subdistrict is a subdistrict of Nanshi District, in the southeast of Baoding, Hebei, People's Republic of China. , it has six residential communities under its administration.

See also
List of township-level divisions of Hebei

References

Township-level divisions of Hebei
Lianchi District